Catocala unijuga, the once-married underwing, is a moth of the family Erebidae. The species was first described by Francis Walker in 1858. It is found in North America from Newfoundland west to south central British Columbia, south to Kentucky and Missouri in the east, Colorado and Utah in the west.

Adults are on wing from July to September in one generation depending on the location.

The larvae feed on Populus tremuloides, Populus nigra and Salix species.

Subspecies
Catocala unijuga unijuga
Catocala unijuga patricia Cassino, 1917 (Utah)

References

External links

Oehlke, Bill. "Catocala unijuga Walker, [1858]". The Catocala Website. Archived October 14, 2008.

unijuga
Moths of North America
Moths described in 1858